David Quinn Mayne, FRS, FIEEE, FREng (born 23 April 1930) is a British academic, engineer, teacher and author.

Career
Mayne began his career in 1950 as a lecturer at the University of the Witwatersrand (1950–54; 1957–59).

He lectured at Imperial College London from 1959-67 and also received his PhD in 1967 at the University of London under John Westcott. He was a Research Fellow at Harvard (1971). At Imperial College he was professor of control theory (1971–91) as well as concurrently heading the Department of Electrical Engineering (1984–88).

He was a professor in the Dept. of Electrical and Computer Engineering at University of California, Davis from 1989-96. From 1996 he has been a professor emeritus.

He was named honorary professor at Beihang University in Beijing in 2006.

His students include Peter Caines.

Awards and affiliations
 Giorgio Quazza Medal, 2014
 IEEE Control Systems Award, 2009
 Hon. DTech Lund University, 1995
 Hon, Fellow Imperial College London, 2000
 FIEEE - 1981
 FRS - 1985
 FREng - 1987
 Fellow, International Federation of Automatic Control, 2006

Selected publications
 Differential Dynamic Programming  (1970)

References

External links
 Biodata at Debrett's
 Control Global website
 David Q. Mayne publications (with Saša V. Raković, and others) 
  David Q. Mayne aided the creation of software that he contributed to algorithmically 

1930 births
Living people
British electrical engineers
Academics of Imperial College London
University of California, Davis faculty
Fellows of the Royal Society
Fellows of the Royal Academy of Engineering
Fellow Members of the IEEE
Academic staff of the University of the Witwatersrand